This is a list of transportation fires where a ship or other transportation has caught on fire.

List of transportation fires

Ship fires

 1800British warship  — 673 deaths
 1807The slave ship  — some 100 deaths 
 1840Steamship Lexington in Long Island Sound — 139 deaths
 1865Sultana on the Mississippi River, near Memphis, Tennessee — 1,547 deaths
 1893Cargo ship  in Santander, Spain — 590 deaths
 1904Steamship General Slocum in New York City — 1,021 deaths
 1906 fire in Hong Kong — 130+ deaths (14 October)
 1908 in Malta — at least 118 deaths
1913 burned at sea, later scuttled — 135 deaths
 1917Munitions ship Mont-Blanc burned, drifted and detonated in the Halifax Explosion — roughly 2,000 deaths
 1924City of Singapore at Port Adelaide — 3 deaths, 13 injured
 1934 off Asbury Park, New Jersey — 137 deaths, ship gutted and beached
 1941Attack on Pearl Harbor, sinking  and several other ships; extensive fires generated aboard and around ships
 1942 in New York City, ship capsized and sank at pier
 1944Bombay Explosion (1944) — Fort Stikine docked in Bombay, India underwent a fire which caused two explosions and set fire to the area killing around 800 people
 1944Port Chicago disaster — E A Bryan docked in Port Chicago, California underwent massive explosions and fire while munitions were loaded. 320 people were killed and 390 were injured. 
 1947Texas City disaster — two ships' cargoes of ammonium nitrate caught fire and exploded, killing 581, more than 5,000 injured.
 1947 in Hong Kong — 200 deaths
 1949 in Toronto, Ontario Canada — 118 to 139 deaths
 1958 – Artemis - after collision at Hoek van Holland, port of Rotterdam
 1963 near Madeira burned — 128 deaths
 1965 near Nassau, Bahamas — 90 deaths
 1965Orient Trader in Toronto, Ontario, Canada — no deaths or injuries. Was towed from pier into harbour and totally destroyed by fire.
 1967 in the Gulf of Tonkin — 134 deaths.
 1972 — Collided at Río de la Plata with Tien Chee, a tanker carrying 20 000 tons of crude oil. – 83 deaths
 1972 in Hong Kong, ship sank in harbour
 1980, capsized and burned for three days 
 1985 off the Malabar coast of India — 34 deaths.
 1987Doña Paz in the Philippines — an estimated 4,000 deaths
 1989 Princess of Scandinavia, fire broke out on board during a crossing to Harwich
 1990 off Norway — 159 deaths
 1991Moby Prince disaster in Livorno, Italy. 140 killed.
 1994 near Somalia
 2001 in Allanburg, Ontario, Canada — Bridge lowered on the ship, this tore off the wheelhouse and funnel and caused a fire that burned out the aft cabins and engine room. No deaths.
 2006 in the Caribbean — one death
 2007Cutty Sark, 19th-century clipper in dry dock as a museum ship in Greenwich, London, extensively damaged while undergoing restoration on May 21
 2011, Norwegian cruise ship, September 15, two deaths
 2014 in Strait of Otranto, Greece — 12 deaths confirmed (including two rescue crew members who died indirectly), 18 others believed dead.
 2019MV Conception, dive boat in California's Channel Islands – 34 deaths.
2022 Superyacht Princess in Torquay, sank in harbour

Train and rail fires
 1866Welwyn Tunnel rail crash in Hertfordshire, England causes a major fire in the tunnel, killing 2 on June 9
 1903Paris Métro train fire kills 84
 1910Hawes Junction rail crash in Cumbria, England kills 12 chiefly through fire on December 24
 1913Ais Gill rail crash in Cumbria, England kills 14 chiefly through fire on September 1
 1915Quintinshill rail crash in Scotland kills 227 chiefly through fire on May 22
 1915St Bedes Junction rail crash near Jarrow, England, kills 19 chiefly through fire on December 17
 1928Charfield railway disaster in Gloucestershire, England kills 16 chiefly through fire on October 13
 1939 Three freight cars loaded with explosives caught fire at Peñaranda de Bracamonte station, on the railway from Ávila to Salamanca. Cars exploded and the explosion extend to a store in which had 319 tonnes of aircraft bombs that exploded too. Almost 100 killed and 1500 injured, on July 9.
 1944 Accident of mail train from Madrid to la Coruña and Vigo in a tunnel in Torre del Bierzo, near León, Spain, 100 killed on January, 3.
 1951Sakuragicho commuter train fire, Yokohama, Japan, 106 killed on April 24
 1964New York City Subway fire at Grand Central Station, which started on an automated shuttle train and destroyed several subway cars, some platforms, and station support beams on April 21.
 1965 Mail train from Madrid to Barcelona caugth fire in Grisén, near Zaragoza, Spain. Almost 34 killed and 33 injured, on february 10.
 1972Hokuriku railroad tunnel fire in Tsuruga, Japan, 31 killed and 637 injured
 1974New York City Subway fire at the BMT's Metropolitan Avenue Station of the Myrtle Avenue Line in Middle Village, Queens NY 11379, resulting in the complete destruction of the station's entire wooden island platform, destroying R27's 8202–03, 8237, R30 # 8512 in the process, with partial fire damage to R32 # 3659 as well on July 16.
 1974Magude train disaster on March 27 in Magude, Portuguese Mozambique, 70 killed and 200 injured
 1978Taunton train fire on British Rail kills 12 on July 6
 1984Summit tunnel fire in West Yorkshire, England
 1987King's Cross Underground Station fire, London, England, 31 killed, 100 injured on November 18
 19951995 Baku Metro fire kills over 200
 1996Channel Tunnel fire between France and England on November 18
 1998Yaoundé train explosion fuel train explosion, kills 120 people
 2000Kaprun disaster, Austrian funicular train fire, kills 155 people
 2002Al Ayatt train disaster, Egypt
 2002 The Godhra train burning at Godhra, Gujarat, India took place which left 59 people dead leading to the 2002 Gujarat violence
 2003Daegu subway fire in Daegu (South Korea) Train fire caused by arson killed at least 198 people and injured at least 147
 2003Ladhowal train fire, India
 2008Channel Tunnel fire, between France and England
 2012Nellore train fire kills 32 passengers on the Tamil Nadu Express near Nellore in Andhra Pradesh, India
 2013Lac-Mégantic rail disaster kills 47 when an unattended 74-car freight train carrying crude oil rolled downhill and derailed. More than 30 buildings in the town's centre, roughly half of the downtown area, were destroyed.
 2014Several tanker cars carrying crude oil caught fire along the James River in Lynchburg, Virginia.
 2015 L'Enfant Plaza smoke incident, one dead and 84 injured on a Washington, DC Metro train
 2015 Valhalla train crash, six killed after train collides with car at grade crossing
 2017 MTR fire, the suspect was killed months later after setting fire on an MTR train
 2019 Tezgam train fire, 74 killed in Rahim Yar Khan District, Panjab province, Pakistan
 2020 2020 New York City Subway fire kills the train's motorman and injures 16

Bus fires
 1929Fire in a bus in Villafranca de Córdoba, Spain. 14 killed, on september 10.
 1966AEC Routemaster RM1768 catches fire at Marble Arch, London on July 30; all the passengers, along with the driver and conductor, escape without injury. The cause was an overheated flywheel
 1988Carrollton, Kentucky, bus collision—27 deaths on May 14, one of the deadliest bus disasters in US history
 1992 (健康幼稚園火燒車事件) – one bus carrying 50 kindergarten students, teachers, and parents caught fire at Taoyuan City (now Taoyuan District) on their way to the Leofoo Amusement Park, killing 23 and injuring 9
 1996 A bus caugth fire after crash into a car near Bailén, Spain, killing 29, on February 28.
 1997Bus fire, Guangdong, China – bus caught fire on expressway, killing 39 passengers.
 2003 (尊龍客運高速公路火燒車事故)—A charter bus caught fire at Taipei County killing 6 and injuring 4
2005A bus catches fire in Wilmer, Texas while evacuating nursing home residents from incoming Hurricane Rita.
 2007Comilla bus caught fire in Bangladesh, at least fifty-five killed on January 6.
 2008Lower Saxony: A bus caught fire due to a technical malfunction on the A2 Autobahn (Expressway) near Garbsen in Germany, 20 killed on November 4
 2008Boromo bus caught fire in Balé Province, Burkina Faso, sixty-seven killed on November 15
 2008Firozabad bus caught fire in Uttar Pradesh, India, killing sixty-three on December 9.
 2009Chengdu bus fire, a mass murder–suicide attack Chengdu, Sichuan, China, results in 27 deaths on June 5
 2010During the Mount Carmel forest fire, a bus that was transporting prison guards was caught up in a wildfire as they made their way to evacuate a nearby prison, resulting in the death of 40 guards as flames overwhelmed the bus
 2011Xinyang bus fire kills at least 41 people in Xinyang, Henan, China, on 22 July.
 2013A bus fire in Xiamen, China, believed to be an act of arson, killed 47 and injured 30.
 2013Volvo bus fire killed 45 Hyderabad-Bengaluru Highway in India.
 2014Colombia bus fire killed 32 children who had just attended a church service in the city of Fundación 18 May 2014.
 2014Six people died and dozens were injured in a bus terminal fire near Seoul, South Korea on 26 May 2014.
 2016Taoyuan City coach fire killing 24 Mainland Chinese tourists with its Taiwanese driver and tour guide.
 2016 New York State Adirondack Trailways bus destroyed by brake fire.
 2018 52 passengers died in 2018 Kazakhstan bus fire, all Uzbek migrants travelling to Russia.

Road fires
 1982Salang tunnel fire kills between 150 and 3,000 people in Afghanistan's only road tunnel
 1982Caldecott Tunnel fire kills six and severely damages major road tunnel in Oakland, California
 1991 Multiple collision of 25 vehicles due to fog in A-8 Highway from Bilbao to Behobia near Amorebieta, Spain. Several vehicles caugth fire, killing 18, on December, 6.
 19991999 Mont Blanc Tunnel fire—39 deaths, caused by the cargo of a transport truck catching fire while in the tunnel

Tanker truck fires and explosions
 1978Los Alfaques disaster kills 217 on a campsite near Tarragona, in Spain on July 11
 2000Ibadan tanker truck explosion multiple car pile-up explodes 100–200 killed.
 20092009 Kenyan oil spill ignition resulted in the deaths of at least 111 people and infliction of gruesome injuries to countless hundreds more on 31 January, following a road accident in Molo, Kenya.
 2010Catastrophe of Sange in the Democratic Republic of the Congo caused at least 230 deaths and 196 injured.
 2012Okobie road tanker explosion in Nigeria killed at least 95 people and injured 50 others.
 2016Caphiridzange explosion in Mozambique resulted in 80 deaths.
 2017Bahawalpur explosion in Pakistan killed 219 people.
 2021Cap-Haïtien fuel tanker explosion in Haiti killed at least 75 people.

Other fires
 1916Black Tom explosion (fires led to the explosion)
 1937Hindenburg disaster near Lakehurst, New Jersey
 1955Le Mans 24 hour race disaster, Le Mans, France, over 80 killed on June 11
 1967Apollo 1 burned during ground tests at Cape Canaveral January 27, 3 astronauts died
 1973Kingman Explosion Propane tanker BLEVE incident kills 13, injures 107
 1980Saudia Flight 163 A plane catches fire and is destroyed after landing, killing all on board

See also
 List of fires

References

Bibliography
 Marshall, Prince. Wheels of London; The story of London's street transport. The Sunday Times Magazine, 1972. .
 Rolt, L.T.C. Red for Danger. Pan. 1966 ed. .

transportation